The 1912–13 season was the fourth year of football played by Dundee Hibernian, and covers the period from 1 July 1912 to 30 June 1913.

Match results
Dundee Hibernian played a total of 23 matches during the 1912–13 season.

Legend

All results are written with Dundee Hibernian's score first.
Own goals in italics

Second Division

Scottish Cup

References

Dundee United F.C. seasons
Dundee Hibernian